van Est is a Dutch surname that may refer to
Bart van Est (born 1956), Dutch cyclist
Nico van Est (1928-2009), Dutch cyclist 
Piet van Est (1934–1991), Dutch cyclist, brother of Nico and Wilm  
Wim van Est (1923–2003), Dutch cyclist, brother of Nico and Piet 
Willem Hessels van Est (1542–1613), Dutch Catholic commentator on the Pauline epistles 

Dutch-language surnames